Pitiquito is a small town in Pitiquito Municipality in the northwest of the Mexican state of Sonora.

Area and population
The municipal area is 11,979.96 km² which makes up 6.46% of the state total.  The municipal population counted in 2000 was 9,160.  The population of the main settlement and municipal seat was 4,862 in 2000.  It is located at an elevation of 305 meters.

Communities
Puerto Libertad (Sonora)

Climate
In this region the climate is hot and dry with rainfall between 75 and 200 mm a year.  Between December and February nighttime temperatures can drop to 8.5 °C below zero while from June to August they can reach 49.5 °C.

History
When the Spanish arrived the area was populated by various sedentary tribes settled along the banks of the Altar and Magdalena rivers.  It was founded by Fr. Eusebio Francisco Kino in 1694 with the name of Natividad del Señor de Pitiquin. In 1768 the Franciscans took over the churches and the name was changed to San Diego de Pitiquin.  According to local tradition the town took the name of an Indian chief called "Piti or Pitic".  It became a municipality in 1914.

Economic activity
Agriculture covered 6,901 hectares (2000), most of which were irrigated by pumping from wells.  Main crops are  alfalfa, beans, corn, grapes, sorghum, and the production of fodder for the cattle industry. 

Cattle raising is also important with over 30,000 head counted in (2000).

Since this municipality has approximately 170 kilometers of coastline there is also fishing, especially in the settlements of Puerto Libertad and Desemboque. The Mexican power generation parastatal CFE has a large electric plant at Puerto Libertad. A Mexican alternative energy company Biofields is constructing an algae to ethanol system covering several square miles which will process the exhaust from the electric plant.

Tourist sights
Of touristic importance is the San Diego del Pitiquito mission, which sits in the center of town. . It is the oldest church with surviving indigenous art in Sonora.  The drawings are rough, bold, black lines on a white background. They were discovered after being hidden under whitewash for ages. 

The small beach communities along the Gulf of California are also of interest and are yet to be developed.   Puerto de la Libertad is the most important and is situated on a paved highway from  Hermosillo. 
It has an attractive bay with fine sand beaches and gentle waves, which invite visitors for practicing aquatic sports such as swimming, sailing and angling. Nearby are the only boojum (Spanish cirio) forests outside Baja California.

The beach town of El Desemboque is a Seri Indian town on the Seri communal property which is partially in the municipality of Pitiquito.

References
 Enciclopedia de los Municipios de México
 INEGI

External links
Pitiquito, Ayuntamiento Digital (Official Website of Pitiquito, Sonora)
 Mission San Diego del Pitiquito

Populated places in Sonora
Populated places in the Sonoran Desert of Mexico
Populated places established in 1694
1694 establishments in the Spanish Empire
Pitiquito Municipality